The Parmulariaceae are a family of fungi with an uncertain taxonomic placement in the class Dothideomycetes.

Genera 

According to the 2007 Outline of Ascomycota, the following 34 genera are within the Parmulariaceae; the placement of Hemigrapha is uncertain.

Antoniomyces –
Aldona –
Apoa –
Aldonata –
Aulacostroma –
Campoa –
Coccodothis –
Cocconia –
Cycloschizon –
Cyclostomella –
Dictyocyclus –
Dothidasteroma –
Englerodothis –
Ferrarisia –
?Hemigrapha –
Hysterostomella –
Inocyclus –
?Kentingia –
Kiehlia –
Mintera –
Pachypatella –
Palawania -
Palawaniella –
Parmularia –
Parmulariopsella –
Parmulariopsis –
Parmulina –
Perischizon –
Polycyclina –
Polycyclus –
Protothyrium –
Pseudolembosia –
Rhagadolobiopsis –
Rhagadolobium –
Rhipidocarpon –
Symphaeophyma –
Thallomyces –
Viegasiella

References 

 
Dothideomycetes families